Santa Rosa is a city in the Argentine Pampas (lowlands), and the capital of La Pampa Province, Argentina. It lies on the east of the province, on the shore of the Don Tomás Lagoon, at the intersection of National Routes 5 and 35. The city (94,340) and its surroundings hold 102,610 inhabitants,Census-ar 2.010 hold 124.101 inhabitants the capital y Toay  around a third of the population of the province. Its current mayor is Leandro Altolaguirre. 
Founded in 1892 by Tomás Mason, Santa Rosa did not develop into a relatively important agricultural centre until the second half of the 20th century. It is still one of the smallest provincial capitals of the country after Patagonian Rawson, Ushuaia and Viedma.

City sights include the Fitte neighbourhood (1930), the monument to San Martín, the Palace of Justice, the Teatro Español Theatre (1908), the Provincial Art Museum (with paintings by Raúl Soldi, Antonio Berni, Quinquela Martín and other important Argentine painters) and the Provincial Natural History Museum.

The Santa Rosa Airport  is located 2 kilometres from Santa Rosa on Route 35, and serves regular flights to Buenos Aires.

Near Santa Rosa is the city of Toay, together both cities form the Gran Santa Rosa metropolitan area.

Geography

Santa Rosa was founded on the western edge of the Argentine Pampas, in the range of contact of two different natural environments: the end of the plain and the beginning of the land of the Pampas broken valley.

The town occupies part of a centripetal basin having their base in Don Tomás Lagoon, where rainwater drains from the surrounding area. The floor area lies west of it, in hilly terrain where the highest elevations are in the east, with two small plateaus located 200 meters. This high turnover is also observed north, with heights up to 195 meters. From here the terrain descends to the west and south, with slopes that are steep in some areas, since more than 3%. The southwest sector is lower and less undulating area, descending to 167 masl.

Climate
Santa Rosa has a humid subtropical climate (Cfa/Cwa, according to the Köppen climate classification), with warm to hot summers and chilly, dry winters.

Sport
The city is home to football team, Club Atlético Santa Rosa, Club Atlético All Boys and Club Atlético Belgrano.

References

External links

 Santa Rosa Municipality (Spanish)
 Department of Transportation
 
 Tourism (English)

Populated places established in 1892
Populated places in La Pampa Province
Capitals of Argentine provinces
Populated lakeshore places in Argentina
Cities in Argentina
Argentina
La Pampa Province